Peter Dowds (24 August 1871 – 2 September 1895) was a Scottish footballer, who played in the Football League for Aston Villa and Stoke.

Career
Dowds (name spelled Douds in some documentation) was born in Johnstone and joined Celtic in 1889. He began his career as a forward and scored 21 goals in 1890–91 as Celtic finished the inaugural Scottish League season in 3rd place behind Dumbarton and Rangers. He moved to left-half for the 1891–92 campaign as Celtic finished in 2nd place, again behind Dumbarton, and won the Scottish Cup.

He was tempted to move into English football with Aston Villa in the summer of 1892 and he played 20 times in 1892–93 scoring three goals as Villa finished fourth. He then moved on to Stoke where he spent the 1893–94 season playing 19 times as Stoke ended in up in 11th place. He made a return to Celtic for the 1894–95 campaign however he fell ill with tuberculosis and died on 2 September 1895 at the age of just 24.

Career statistics

Club
Source:

International
Source:

References

Sources

External links
 
 London Hearts profile

1871 births
1895 deaths
People from Johnstone
Association football wing halves
Scottish footballers
Scotland international footballers
Stoke City F.C. players
Celtic F.C. players
Aston Villa F.C. players
English Football League players
Place of death missing
Scottish Football League players
Footballers from Renfrewshire
19th-century deaths from tuberculosis
Tuberculosis deaths in Scotland